Yershov (masculine) or Yershova (feminine) is the name of several inhabited localities in Russia.

Modern localities
Urban localities
Yershov, Saratov Oblast, a town in Yershovsky District of Saratov Oblast

Rural localities
Yershov, Karachay-Cherkess Republic, a khutor in Urupsky District of the Karachay-Cherkess Republic; 
Yershov, Volgograd Oblast, a khutor in Goncharovsky Selsoviet of Pallasovsky District in Volgograd Oblast
Yershova, Irkutsk Oblast, a village in Bokhansky District of Irkutsk Oblast
Yershova, Republic of Karelia, a village in Pudozhsky District of the Republic of Karelia
Yershova, Perm Krai, a village in Kudymkarsky District of Perm Krai

Alternative names
Yershov, alternative name of Yershi, a village in Marisolinsky Rural Okrug of Sernursky District in the Mari El Republic; 
Yershova, alternative name of Yershovo, a village in Ardinsky Rural Okrug of Kilemarsky District in the Mari El Republic;